The 26th annual Four Hills Tournament was won by Finnish ski jumper Kari Ylianttila. In the final ranking, he led directly ahead of five East German athletes. Another one, defending champion Jochen Danneberg, was the overall leader after his victory in Garmisch-Partenkirchen, but didn't compete at the events in Austria.

Participating nations and athletes

Results

Oberstdorf
 Schattenbergschanze, Oberstdorf
30 December 1977

Garmisch-Partenkirchen
 Große Olympiaschanze, Garmisch-Partenkirchen
1 January 1978

Innsbruck
 Bergiselschanze, Innsbruck
4 January 1978

Bischofshofen
 Paul-Ausserleitner-Schanze, Bischofshofen
6 January 1978

Final ranking

References

External links
 FIS website
 Four Hills Tournament web site

Four Hills Tournament
1977 in ski jumping
1978 in ski jumping